Auricular glands can refer to:
 Anterior auricular glands or preauricular deep parotid lymph nodes
 Posterior auricular glands or mastoid lymph nodes